Lindi Historic Town (Mji wa kale wa Lindi in Swahili) is a historic area located in the present day small city of Lindi, Lindi Municipal District of Lindi Region in Tanzania. The historic part of town covers the wards of Makonde, Ndoro, Mikundi, Mitandi and Msanjihili wards. The area has building from Swahili, Arab and German tradition reflecting the settlement's history.

Lindi was a major part of the Swahili civilisation, whom established the town in the eleventh century and conducted trade along the coast with other people living near the Indian Ocean. The Swahili town's previous name has never been documented. It may have been called for the native Mwinyi's forefathers. The Omanis ruled the local populace and used the region to trade and transport ivory and slaves to the international market.

References

Lindi Region